Pender Public Schools is a school district located in the town of Pender in northeast Nebraska, United States.  Pender Public Schools serves students in kindergarten through twelfth grade, as well as pre-school students.

For the 2011–2012 school year, Pender Public Schools had an enrollment of 345 students.  The school is in Class D1 (Nebraska School Activities Association) and Class III (Nebraska Department of Education).

External links
 Pender Public Schools

School districts in Nebraska
Education in Thurston County, Nebraska